The Bismarck pitta or New Ireland pitta (Erythropitta novaehibernicae) is a species of the pitta. It was considered a subspecies of the red-bellied pitta. It is endemic to the New Ireland Province in Papua New Guinea. Its natural habitat is subtropical or tropical moist lowland forests.  It is threatened by habitat loss.

References

Bismarck pitta
Birds of New Ireland Province
Bismarck pitta